General elections were held in Dominica in April 1944.

Electoral system
The Legislative Council had eleven members; the Administrator as President, two ex officio members, three appointed members and five elected members. The Administrator could vote only to break a tie.

Results

The appointed members were Arthur Seagar Burleigh, Clement Joseph Leonard Dupigny and James O. Aird.

Aftermath
Nicholls died on 12 November 1945. In the subsequent by-election on 23 February 1946, Phillip Ivor Boyd was elected to replace him.

References

Dominica
1944 in Dominica
Elections in Dominica
Dominica
Election and referendum articles with incomplete results
April 1944 events